December 1 - Eastern Orthodox liturgical calendar - December 3

All fixed commemorations below celebrated on December 15 by Eastern Orthodox Churches on the Old Calendar.

For December 2nd, Orthodox Churches on the Old Calendar commemorate the Saints listed on November 19.

Saints

 Prophet Habakkuk (Abbacum) (7th century BC)
 Martyr Myrope of Chios, under Decius (251)
 Martyr Abibus the New (Abibus of Edessa), Deacon, burned at the stake (c. 307-323)
 Saints John, Heraclemon, Andrew and Theophilus, of Oxyrhynchus, hermits of Egypt (4th century) (see also June 12)
 Saint Moses the Confessor (Moses the Economos).
 Venerable Jesse (Ise, Isidore), Bishop of Tsilkani in Georgia (6th century)
 Saint Solomon, Archbishop of Ephesus  (see also: December 1)

Pre-Schism Western saints

 Saint Evasius, First Bishop of Brescia in Italy.
 Saint Lupus (Luperius), Bishop of Verona in Italy, Confessor.
 Martyrs Eusebius, a priest; Marcellus, a deacon; Hippolytus, Maximus, Adria, Paulina, Neon, Mary, Martana, and Aurelia - under Valerian (c. 254-259)
 Martyr Pontian, with four others, at Rome, under Valerian (c. 259)
 Saint Bibiana (Vibiana, Vivian), a holy virgin martyred in Rome (c. 361-363)
 Saint Chromatius, Bishop of Aquileia near Venice, friend of St John Chrysostom, Confessor (406)
 Martyrs Severus, Securus, Januarius and Victorinus, martyrs in North Africa who suffered under the Vandals (c. 450)
 Saint Silverius, Pope of Rome (537) 
 Saint Trumwine of Abercorn (Trumwin of Whitby), the only ever Bishop of the Northumbrian see of the Picts (late 7th century)  (see also: February 10)

Post-Schism Orthodox saints

 Saint Cyril of Phileotes (in the vicinity of Derkos in Thrace) (1110)
 Venerable Abbacum the Ascetic of Cyprus, Wonderworker (late 12th century)
 Saint Athanasius “the Resurrected,” recluse of the Kiev Caves, whose relics are in the Near Caves (1176) 
 Saint Athanasius, recluse of the Kiev Caves, whose relics are in the Far Caves (1264)
 Saint Stephen-Urosh V, King of Serbia (1371), and his mother St. Helena (1376), of Serbia.
 Saint Joannicius of Devič, Serbia (1430)
 Venerable Hiero-Confessor Alexei (Kabaliuk) of Carpathia, Schema-Archimandrite, of Khust, Apostle of Carpatho-Russia (1947)  (see also: November 19)
 Venerable Elder Porphyrios (Bairaktaris) of Kafsokalivia, an Athonite hieromonk known for his gifts of spiritual discernment (1991)

New martyrs and confessors

 New Hieromartyr John, priest (1919)
 New Hieromartyr Matthew Alexandrov, priest of Simferopol-Crimea (1921)
 New Hieromartyr Demetrius Blagoveshtensky, priest, and Venarable Vera Grafovoy, Confessor (1932)
 New Hieromartyrs (1937):
 Constantine Nekrasov and Nicholas Vinogradsky, Protopresbyters of Moscow;
 Sergius Felitsin, Vladimir Proferansov, John Derzhavin, Theodore Alexinsky, Nicholas Zabolotsky, John Dniprovsky, Nicholas Safonov, Priests; 
 Hieromartyrs Danact Kalashnikov of Moscow and Alma Ata (hieromonk), and Cosmas Magda;
 Hieromartyrs (Nuns): Theuromia, Tamara Provorkinoy, Antonina Stepanova, and Mary Dmitrievska;
 Virgin-martyrs: Mary Zhuravlevoy and Matrona Konyukhova.
 Virgin-martyr Mary Zeitlin (1938)
 Martyr Boris Uspensky (1942)

Other commemorations

 Repose of Elder Luke “the Guestmaster” of Valaam (Schema-abbot Luke), (1965)

Icon gallery

Notes

References

Sources 
 December 2/15. Orthodox Calendar (PRAVOSLAVIE.RU).
 December 15 / December 2. HOLY TRINITY RUSSIAN ORTHODOX CHURCH (A parish of the Patriarchate of Moscow).
 December 2. OCA - The Lives of the Saints.
 December 2. Latin Saints of the Orthodox Patriarchate of Rome.
 The Roman Martyrology. Transl. by the Archbishop of Baltimore. Last Edition, According to the Copy Printed at Rome in 1914. Revised Edition, with the Imprimatur of His Eminence Cardinal Gibbons. Baltimore: John Murphy Company, 1916. pp. 371–372.
 Rev. Richard Stanton. A Menology of England and Wales, or, Brief Memorials of the Ancient British and English Saints Arranged According to the Calendar, Together with the Martyrs of the 16th and 17th Centuries. London: Burns & Oates, 1892. p. 579.
Greek Sources
 Great Synaxaristes:  2 ΔΕΚΕΜΒΡΙΟΥ. ΜΕΓΑΣ ΣΥΝΑΞΑΡΙΣΤΗΣ.
  Συναξαριστής. 2 Δεκεμβρίου. ECCLESIA.GR. (H ΕΚΚΛΗΣΙΑ ΤΗΣ ΕΛΛΑΔΟΣ). 
Russian Sources
  15 декабря (2 декабря). Православная Энциклопедия под редакцией Патриарха Московского и всея Руси Кирилла (электронная версия). (Orthodox Encyclopedia - Pravenc.ru).
  2 декабря (ст.ст.) 15 декабря 2013 (нов. ст.). Русская Православная Церковь Отдел внешних церковных связей. (DECR).

December in the Eastern Orthodox calendar